Marking blue or layout stain (sometimes called Dykem after trademark erosion of a popular brand, or Prussian blue after the blue pigment) is a dye used in metalworking to aid in marking out rough parts for further machining. It is used to stain or paint a metal object with a very thin layer of dye that can be scratched off using a scriber or other sharp instrument to reveal a bright, yet very narrow line in the metal underneath. The advantages are that any existing scratches are covered with the dye and the new lines have a contrasting background.

Prussian blue and Dykem or layout fluid are not the same. Prussian blue is non drying and used to mark place of pressure contact between two surfaces. Prussian blue is transferred to the surface. Dykem, layout fluid dries and is mostly used to provide bright lines when using a scribe to mark hard surfaces or point of contact between two surfaces. Dyken is removed from the surface.

Composition 

Marking blue is made by mixing methylated spirits with shellac and gentian violet.

Alternatives 

A felt tip marker can be used as they are convenient and tend not to dry up as quickly. On rough structures, such as castings or forgings, whitewash or a mixture of chalk and water can be used. A solution of copper sulfate, distilled water, and a few drops of sulfuric acid can be used on machined surfaces.

Safety 

Marking blue is considered non-toxic. If heated above 250 degrees Celsius it will give off toxic Cyanogen gas. Metal cutting commonly heats material above this level.

References 

Dyes
Metalworking measuring instruments